Stompin is an album by organist Shirley Scott recorded in 1961 (with one track from 1960) and released on the Prestige label in 1967.

Reception
The Allmusic review awarded the album 3 stars.

Track listing 
 "Stompin' at the Savoy" (Benny Goodman, Andy Razaf, Edgar Sampson, Chick Webb) - 4:56  
 "You're My Everything" (Mort Dixon, Harry Warren, Joe Young) - 5:50  
 "Trav'lin' Light" (Johnny Mercer, Jimmy Mundy, Trummy Young) - 5:39 
 "This Can't Be Love" (Lorenz Hart, Richard Rodgers) - 
 "From This Moment On" (Cole Porter) - 4:20 
 "Down by the Riverside" (Traditional) - 9:01 
Recorded at Van Gelder Studio in Englewood Cliffs, New Jersey on April 12, 1960 (track 5), March 24, 1961 (tracks 1-3 & 6), and November 15, 1962 (track 4).

Personnel 
 Shirley Scott - organ (tracks 1-3, 5, 6)
 Ronnell Bright - piano (tracks 1-3 & 6)
 Wally Richardson - guitar (tracks 1-3 & 6) 
 Peck Morrison (tracks 1-3 & 6), Wendell Marshall (track 5) - bass
 Roy Haynes (tracks 1-3 & 6), Arthur Edgehill (track 5) - drums
 Ray Barretto - congas (track 5)
 Don Patterson - organ (track 4)
 Paul Weeden - guitar (track 4)
 Billy James - drums (track 4)
 Eddie "Lockjaw" Davis - tenor saxophone (tracks 4, 5)

References 

1967 albums
Albums produced by Esmond Edwards
Albums recorded at Van Gelder Studio
Prestige Records albums
Shirley Scott albums